= Nattr =

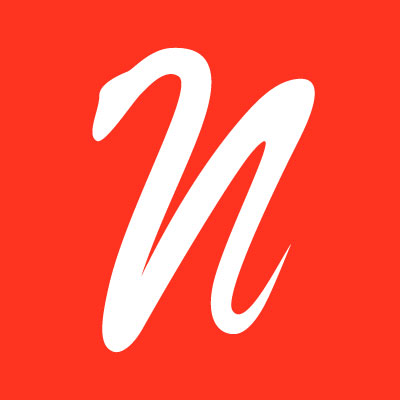
- Headquarters: London, {{{location_country}}}
- Founders: Melanie Mercier and Laura Russell
- Industry: Social media
- Website: nattr.com
- Launched: March 2015
- Current status: Active beta

Nattr is a social application that crowdsources responses to messages. It is commonly used to source icebreakers and replies to sensitive text messages.

Nattr was founded by Melanie Mercier and Laura Russell. Nattr was launched in beta March 2015.

== Features ==
Star Responders: A star responder is a writer that has been verified by Nattr. If a user would like to request a star response, they can purchase charms to pay for one, or accumulate charms by responding to messages on Nattr

Public or Private: All messages are anonymous however, the option exists to send a message to everyone in the Nattr community or send it privately to those selected.

== How it works ==
Login using Facebook or phone number and submit a screenshot of a conversation that needs a reply. Then post it out to the Nattr community for responses.
